The 2013–14 DePaul Blue Demons women's basketball team represents DePaul University during the 2013–14 NCAA Division I women's basketball season. The Blue Demons, led by twenty eighth year head coach Doug Bruno, played their home games at the Allstate Arena and the McGrath-Phillips Arena. They are members of the new Big East Conference. In their first season in the Big East, the Blue Demons went 27-5, 15-3 in conference play, to earn the 1 seed in the Big East tournament. The Blue Demons would host all games of the Tournament and walk away with the 2014 tournament title.

Roster

Schedule

|-
!colspan=9 style="background:#E60D2E; color:#006EC7;"| Exhibition

|-
!colspan=9 style="background:#E60D2E; color:#006EC7;"| Regular season

|-
!colspan=9 style="background:#E60D2E;"| Big East tournament

|-
!colspan=9 style="background:#E60D2E;"| NCAA tournament

References

DePaul Blue Demons women's basketball seasons
DePaul
DePaul Blue Demons women's basketball
DePaul Blue Demons women's basketball
DePaul